C. V. Cusachs was the head baseball coach of the LSU Tigers baseball team in 1899. During his one season as head coach, he finished the season with a 5–5–1 record and  winning percentage.

References
 

Baseball coaches from Louisiana
LSU Tigers baseball coaches